Amir Dawud(1977-2019) was an Ethiopian Tigrigna singer, writer, poem writer, melodist. He was born in Tigray region, Mekelle city.

Biography

Early life
Amir was born to his father Sheik Dawud Adem and mother Mrs. Bekita-ab Abdela in the Mekelle zone of Tigray region, in a place called Addi Aslam in Tabia 04 in 1977 (1970 EC).  He went to school in the city high school known as Meserete Elementary School and Secondary School in Atsey Yohannes IV and in Addis Ababa. He was a father of three daughters. One of his daughter named Raei Meles Amir, a name given in love of the late visionary leader of Ethiopia, PM Meles Zenawi.

Professional career
Amir was a prolific songwriter and singer. He produced two music albums (the first album with singer Mizan Tesfay) and had given many lyrics to other popular Tigrigna singers including Abraham Gebremedhin, Trhas Tareke, and Solomon Bayre.

Death and funeral

Amir died on Mar 01, 2019.

See also
Music of Ethiopia

References

1977 births
2019 deaths
People from Tigray Region
21st-century Ethiopian male singers